The Melges 20, originally called the Audi Melges 20, is an American trailerable sailboat that was designed by Reichel/Pugh as a one-design racer and first built in 2007.

The design was accepted as a World Sailing international class in November 2012.

Production
The design has built by McConaghy Boats in China for Melges Performance Sailboats of the United States, since 2007 and remains in production.

Design
The Melges 20 is a racing keelboat, built predominantly of fiberglass. It has a fractional sloop rig with a roller furling jib. The hull has a plumb stem, a slightly reverse transom, a transom-hung rudder controlled by a tiller and a retractable lifting keel, with a lead bulb weight. It displaces .

With it retracted the boat can be operated in shallow water or transported on a boat trailer.

The boat is factory-equipped with a small outboard motor for docking and maneuvering. It  is sailed by a crew of two to four sailors with no class weight restrictions.

Operational history
The boat is supported by an active class club that organizes racing events, the International Melges 20 Class Association.

In a 2008 review by two writers for Sailing World magazine, Dave Reed wrote, "the boat has superb balance, and obviously, the faster we went the better it felt. Carving up and down to catch waves was easy and the boat quickly jumped on surfs ... and frankly, had we had one less body, we could have done another tick or two better." Stuart Streuli reported, "the Melges 20 is a hoot to sail. It tracks like a train upwind, rewarding a steady hand on the tiller, and is very nimble off the wind. We hit speeds of 13 to 14 knots downwind in 15 to 20 knots of wind and very rough seas. It’s tippy, and much more like a dinghy than the 24. When the lulls hit, the boat would quickly roll to windward, both upwind and down."

Events

See also
List of sailing boat types

References

External links

Melges 20